Adaganahalli  is a village in the southern state of Karnataka, India. It is located in the Krishnarajanagara taluk of Mysore district.

See also 
 Mysore
 Districts of Karnataka

References

External links 

Villages in Mysore district